is a song recorded by Japanese singer songwriter Mai Kuraki. It was written by Mai Kuraki and Akihito Tokunaga. The song is set to be released through Northern Music on March 20, 2019, as a double-A side with "Kimi to Koi no Mama de Owarenai Itsumo Yume no Mama ja Irarenai". The single was released as a digital single and in five physical editions: standard edition, limited edition A/B, Detective Conan edition, and Musing &  edition. The song was served as the theme song to the Japanese animation Case Closed.

Promotion

Meet and greet events
In support of the single, Kuraki embarked on the ten-leg meet and greet events. At the tour, Kuraki sang several song and went on to hand her merchandise, mini calendar, to the audiences. Fans were also allowed to do high-fives with her.

Music video 
The short version of an accompanying music video for the song was premiered on Kuraki's YouTube account on February 20, 2019.
The full version of the video was not released on YouTube; will be included only in the DVD accompanied with the limited edition B of the single.

Live performance 
Kuraki first performed "Barairo no Jinsei", alongside "Kimi to Koi no Mama de Owarenai Itsumo Yume no Mama ja Irarenai", at the meet and greet event on January 20, 2019.

Track listing

Charts

Certification and sales

|-
! scope="row"| Japan (RIAJ)
| 
| 37,291 
|-
|}

Release history

References

2019 singles
Mai Kuraki songs
Songs written by Mai Kuraki
2019 songs
Songs with music by Akihito Tokunaga
Song recordings produced by Daiko Nagato